Ali Coşkun is Turkey's minister of Industry and Trade. He was born in Başpınar village of Kemaliye, Erzincan in 1939. He graduated from the Faculty of Engineering, Yıldız Technical University and served as President of the Turkish Union of Chambers and Commodity Exchanges and as Vice President of the Islamic Countries Union of Chambers. Coşkun was elected as Istanbul deputy for the third electoral district. He is married with two children and speaks German and English.

He took sides during the controversy about the movie Valley of the Wolves Iraq, and predicted that it would make it to film history, emphasizing "God bless the Turks."

Notes

1939 births
Living people
People from Kemaliye
Justice and Development Party (Turkey) politicians
Deputies of Istanbul
Yıldız Technical University alumni
Members of the 22nd Parliament of Turkey
Members of the 21st Parliament of Turkey
Members of the 20th Parliament of Turkey
Industry ministers of Turkey
Trade ministers of Turkey